Macasinia vilhena is a species of moth of the family Tortricidae. It is found in Rondônia, Brazil.

The wingspan is about 9.5 mm. The ground colour of the forewings is whitish, slightly suffused with olive grey. The dots and strigulae are pale brownish grey and the markings are pale greyish brown. The hindwings are whitish proximally, but brownish otherwise.

Etymology
The species name refers to the type locality, Vilhena.

References

Moths described in 2007
Cochylini